Cauldcots railway station served the hamlet of Cauldcots, Angus, Scotland, from 1883 to 1930 on the North British, Arbroath and Montrose Railway.

History 
The station opened in October 1883 by the North British, Arbroath and Montrose Railway.

The station was host to a LNER camping coach from 1936 to 1939.

The station closed to both passengers and goods traffic on 22 September 1930.

References

External links 

Disused railway stations in Angus, Scotland
Former North British Railway stations
Railway stations in Great Britain opened in 1883
Railway stations in Great Britain closed in 1930
1883 establishments in Scotland
1930 disestablishments in Scotland